Modra is a Canadian drama film, directed by Ingrid Veninger and released in 2010. The film stars Hallie Switzer as Lina, a Canadian teenager visiting her extended family in Slovakia with her friend Leco (Alexander Gammell).

Switzer is Veninger's real-life daughter, and many of the extended family roles were played by Veninger's own real-life family.

The film premiered at the 2010 Toronto International Film Festival. It was subsequently named to TIFF's year-end Canada's Top Ten list for 2010.

References

External links
 

2010 films
Canadian drama films
Films shot in Slovakia
Films directed by Ingrid Veninger
Films set in Slovakia
2010s Canadian films